The Runaway Princess is a 1929 British-German silent drama film directed by Anthony Asquith and Fritz Wendhausen and starring Mady Christians, Fred Rains, Paul Cavanagh, and Anne Grey.

Production
The film was a co-production between British Instructional Films and the German company Laender Film. It was made at Laenderfilm Studios in Berlin and Welwyn Studios in Hertfordshire. It was based on the 1905 novel Princess Priscilla's Fortnight by Lady Elizabeth Russell. An alternative German-language version known as Priscillas Fahrt ins Glück was directed by Fritz Wendhausen.

Cast

References

External links
 

1929 films
British silent feature films
Films of the Weimar Republic
1929 drama films
German silent feature films
British black-and-white films
Films directed by Anthony Asquith
Films directed by Fritz Wendhausen
British drama films
British multilingual films
Films based on British novels
German multilingual films
German black-and-white films
German drama films
Films shot at Welwyn Studios
1920s British films
Silent drama films
1920s German films
1920s multilingual films